This is a list of prime ministers of the Republic of the Congo since the formation of the post of prime minister in 1963, to the present day.

A total of seventeen people have served as Prime Minister of the Republic of the Congo (not counting one acting prime minister). Additionally, one person, Louis Sylvain Goma, has served on two non-consecutive occasions.

The incumbent prime minister is Anatole Collinet Makosso, since 12 May 2021.

Key
Political parties

Other factions

Status

List of officeholders

Timeline

See also

 Politics of the Republic of the Congo
 List of presidents of the Republic of the Congo
 Vice President of the Republic of the Congo

External links
World Statesmen (Congo-Brazzaville)

Republic of the Congo
Prime ministers
Prime ministers
Prime ministers
Prime ministers